The Mills Building and Tower is a two-building complex following the Chicago school with Romanesque design elements in the Financial District of San Francisco, California. The structures were declared San Francisco Designated Landmark #76, and were listed on the National Register of Historic Places in 1974.

History

The original 10-story,  structure was designed by Burnham and Root/D.H. Burnham & Company completed 1892; and after surviving the 1906 earthquake, was restored by Willis Polk in 1908, who oversaw subsequent additions in 1914 and 1918. Named for early San Francisco financial tycoon, Darius Ogden Mills, it is regarded as the city's second skyscraper, after the Chronicle Building (1890).

Completed in 1932 at 220 Bush Street, Mills Tower is a 22-story,  annex designed by George W. Kelham and Lewis Parsons Hobart.

The Mills Building is home to several major financial firms, including SeatMe, Pocket Gems, New York Stock Exchange, and Newedge.

See also
List of San Francisco Designated Landmarks

References

Further reading

External links
The Mills Building official website

Skyscraper office buildings in San Francisco
Financial District, San Francisco
Commercial buildings completed in 1892
Commercial buildings completed in 1931
Commercial buildings on the National Register of Historic Places in California
National Register of Historic Places in San Francisco
San Francisco Designated Landmarks
Swig Company
Burnham and Root buildings
Chicago school architecture in California
Romanesque Revival architecture in California
1892 establishments in California